Thomas Wander, (Graz, 19 April 1973) also credited as Thomas Wanker, is an Austrian-born composer for film and television. While his original plans were to play piano in a jazz band, as a teenager he took notice of the emotional response he had to the scores for E.T. the Extraterrestrial and Once Upon a Time in America and grew an interest in film music. In 1992, he moved to Los Angeles to study film composition at the University of Southern California. He has won the BMI Film Music Award in 2008 for his score in 10,000 BC, in 2010 for his score in the film 2012, and in 2014 for the score to White House Down. Wander frequently collaborates with fellow composer Harald Kloser on many of his projects, and is best known for his work on the films of director Roland Emmerich.

Filmography
The Venice Project (1999)
After the Truth (1999)
Ali: An American Hero (2000)
Buffy the Vampire Slayer (TV series, 2000–2002)
The Tunnel (2001)
Dracula (2002)
Sins of the Father (2002)
RFK (2002)
Dresden (2006)
10,000 BC (2008)
2012 (2009)
White House Down (2013)
Independence Day: Resurgence (2016)
Midway (2019)
Moonfall (2022)

References

External links
Official Website

Air-Edel Associates

1973 births
Austrian film score composers
Austrian record producers
Austrian television composers
Buffy the Vampire Slayer
Living people
Male film score composers
Male television composers
Varèse Sarabande Records artists